Luna E-8-5 No.405, also known as Luna Ye-8-5 No.405, and sometimes identified by NASA as Luna 1970A, was a Soviet spacecraft which was lost in a launch failure in 1970. It was a  Luna E-8-5 spacecraft, the fifth of eight to be launched. It was intended to perform a soft landing on the Moon, collect a sample of lunar soil, and return it to the Earth.

Launch 
Luna E-8-5 No.405 was launched at 04:16:06 UTC on 6 February 1970 atop a Proton-K 8K78K carrier rocket with a Blok-D upper stage, flying from Site 81/23 at the Baikonur Cosmodrome. A defective pressure sensor caused the first stage to shut down 128 seconds after launch. The booster crashed downrange. Prior to the release of information about its mission, NASA correctly identified that it had been an attempted sample return mission.

References

Luna programme
Spacecraft launched in 1970
1970 in the Soviet Union
Sample return missions